The Sex de Marinda is a mountain of the Swiss Pennine Alps, located south of Grimentz in the canton of Valais. It lies east of the Sasseneire, 90 km south of capital Bern. The peak level is 2906 meters above the sea level, 117 meters above the surrounding terrain. Width at its peak's base is 0.55 km.

Terrain near Sex de Marinda is mountainous. The highest point nearby is Sasseneire, 3,254 meters above sea level, 2.3 km southwest of Sex de Marinda.

References

External links
 Sex de Marinda on Hikr

Mountains of the Alps
Mountains of Switzerland
Mountains of Valais
Two-thousanders of Switzerland